Indacrinone is a loop diuretic. It can be used in patients of gout with hypertension as an antihypertensive because it decreases reabsorption of uric acid, while other diuretics increase it.

Chirality and biological activity 

Indacrinone is a chiral drug, with  one chiral center and hence exists as mirror-image twins. (R)-enantiomer, the eutomer, is diuretic whereas the mirror-image version (S)-enantiomer counteracts side effect of the eutomer. Here both the enantiomers contribute to the overall desired effect  in different ways. 

As indicated earlier, the (R)- enantiomer is the pharmacologically active diuretic. Like most other diuretics, the (R)-isomer possesses an undesirable side-effect of retaining uric acid. But the (S)-enantiomer, the distomer, has the property of assisting uric acid secretion (uricosuric effect), and, therefore, antagonizing the undesirable side-effects of the eutomer (uric-acid retention). It affords a good argument for the marketing of a racemic mixture. But studies exemplify that 9:1 mixture of the two enantiomers provides optimal therapeutic value.

See also 

 Chiral drugs
 Chirality
 Eudisimic ratio

References 

Diuretics
Carboxylic acids
Chloroarenes